Moosdorf is a municipality in the district of Braunau am Inn in the region of Innviertel within the Austrian state of Upper Austria. It had a population of 1,684 as at 1 January 2019.

The name Moosdorf  (lit.: "moss village") relates to its proximity to the Ibmer Moor, the largest bog complex in Austria and the easternmost of all pre-Alpine bogs. Moos is Upper German for "moor" or "bog".

Subdivisions 

The municipality incorporates the following 15 villages and hamlets (with population in brackets as at 1 Jan 2019):

The municipality consists of the cadastral municipalities of Moosdorf and Stadl.

References

Cities and towns in Braunau am Inn District